Chennithala is a census town in Mavelikkara taluk of Alappuzha district, Kerala state, India.  This village consists mainly of paddy fields and coconut groves.

Places of worship

Thripperumthura Sree Mahadevar Temple, Ayyakkasheril Sree Mahadevar Temple,  Karazhma Devi Temple, Chala Sree Mahadevar Temple, Puthuvila Bhagavathi Temple, Valiyamadom  Devi Temple, Kannannoor Devi Temple and Irampaman Sree Subramania Swamy Temple, Cherukole Sree Subrahmania Swamy-Sree Dharma Sastha Temple, Chennitala Sidhashramam are major temples of this village.

Location
Chennithala is located in the Mavelikkara Taluk of Alappuzha district, in the Kerala state. Chennithala village is 6 km north from Mavelikkara, 4 km from Mannar to south, 9 km from Harippad (towards east) and 12 km from Chengannur (towards West) Town. 
Valiya perumpumpuzha bridge connects Chennithala to Thattarambalam in the south part. Achankovil River flows through Chennithala.

Demographics
As of 2011 Census, Chennithala had a population of 12,360 with 5,719 males and 6,641 females. Chennithala had an average literacy of 97% higher than the state average of 94%; male literacy was 98.2% and female literacy was 95.9%.

Transportation
The very nearest railway station is Mavelikara (MVLK) and the other nearby railway stations include Chengannur (CNGR) and Harippad (HAD). In addition to this, the Thiruvala (TRVL) and Kayamkulam Junction (KYJ) Railway Stations are well connected by both KSRTC and private buses. The nearest KSRTC station is located in Mavelikkara and buses to most of the stations in the Kerala state are interconnected by KSRTC. In addition to this, a few interstate services are also available (Mavelikara-Tenkasi-Mavelikara service) which does not pass through Chennithala.

Festivals

Chennithala has a Palliyodam (holy snake boat) owned by Chennithala South NSS No:93, which participates in the Aaranmula Utrattathi Jalolstavam (Water Festival) held in Aaranmula during the Onam season. Chennithala palliyodam travels around 85 KM through different water ways to reach Aranmula. This is the most distant Palliyodam attending Aranmula Jalolstavam.  

Valiya perumpuzha bridge connects it to Thattarambalam in the south of Chennithala. The nearest railway stations are Mavelikkara, Chengannur and Harippad; also, the Thiruvalla and Kayamkulam Railway Stations are well connected by both KSRTC and private buses. 

St. George Orthodox Valiyapally or Chennithala Valliyapally is an ancient and popular church in Chennithala; it is about 160 years old.  It was dedicated by Geevarghese Gregorios of Parumala (Parumala Thirumeni).

Chennithala is very near to Parumala Seminary Church, the tomb of the great Geevarghese Gregorios of Parumala.

Chennithala Sidhashramam Pattamudyam:- This festival on April 23 is held in the Chennithala Sidhashram, the first ashram in Chennithala. Every year, Pattamudyamaholsam, Annadanam and Kudam pooja are held in Chennithala.

References

External links

Chennithala St.George Horeb Jacobite Syrian Church

Villages in Alappuzha district